Re-Inventions: Best of the Vanguard Years is a greatest hits compilation of folk guitarist Sandy Bull, released in 1999 through Vanguard Records. It comprises pieces from three of his albums: Fantasias for Guitar and Banjo, Inventions and Demolition Derby.

Track listing

Personnel 
Sandy Bull – acoustic guitar, banjo, oud, bass guitar, guitar, percussion
Drew Cartwright – design
Denis Charles – tabla on "Carnival Jump"
David Gahr – photography
Billy Higgins – drums
Richard Knapp – photography
Tom Vickers – production
Jeff Zaraya – engineering

References 

1999 greatest hits albums
Sandy Bull albums
Vanguard Records compilation albums